The gray-headed lemur (Eulemur cinereiceps), or gray-headed brown lemur, is a medium-sized primate, a cathemeral species of lemur in the family Lemuridae. Until a taxonomic revision in 2008, it was known as the white-collared brown lemur or white-collared lemur (Eulemur albocollaris). It lives in south-eastern Madagascar. It is highly threatened by hunting and habitat loss, and was considered to be among the 25 most endangered primates in 2006–2008. It is currently listed as Critically Endangered by the International Union for Conservation of Nature (IUCN) due to a highly restricted range, and has been named one of "The World's 25 Most Endangered Primates."

The gray-headed lemur is only found in southeastern Madagascar, from the Manampatrana River south to the Mananara River.

Change in taxonomy
Recent genetic and morphological evidence has suggested that the former name, E. albocollaris, was actually a junior synonym of E. cinereiceps. Consequently, the common name gray-headed lemur and the scientific name Eulemur cinereiceps were resurrected to replace white-collared brown lemur and E. albocollaris respectively.

Previously, this species was listed as a subspecies of the common brown lemur until elevated to species status in 2001. However, genetic and field studies still support subspecies status under the biological species concept.

References

True lemurs
Endemic fauna of Madagascar
Mammals of Madagascar
Critically endangered fauna of Africa
Mammals described in 1890
Fauna of the Madagascar lowland forests
Taxa named by Alfred Grandidier
Taxa named by Alphonse Milne-Edwards